Axtell High School can refer to:

Axtell High School, in Axtell, Kansas
Axtell High School (Nebraska), Axtell, Nebraska
Axtell High School (Texas), Axtell, Texas